Rowing at the 2015 Southeast Asian Games was held in Marina Channel, Singapore from 11 to 14 June 2015.

Participating nations
A total of 173 athletes from seven nations will be competing in rowing at the 2015 Southeast Asian Games:

Competition schedule
The following is the competition schedule for the rowing competitions:

Medalists

Men

Women

Medal table

References

External links
  

2015
Southeast Asian Games
2015 Southeast Asian Games events